Avalanche Software is an American video game developer based in Salt Lake City, Utah and a subsidiary of Warner Bros. Games. It was founded in October 1995 by four programmers formerly of Sculptured Software, including John Blackburn, who serves as chief executive officer. The studio was acquired by the games arm of The Walt Disney Company in May 2005, and spent the next ten years developing Disney-related titles, including the toys-to-life game Disney Infinity (2013). In May 2016, due to a declining toys-to-life games market, Disney decided to close the games arm, including Avalanche. Warner Bros. Games acquired the studio and re-opened it in January 2017.

History 
Avalanche Software was founded by four programmers formerly of Sculptured Software, including John Blackburn. After Sculptured Software had been acquired by Acclaim Entertainment, the four had been in contact with another former Sculptured Software staffer who left the year prior for Saffire. The four were interested in joining Saffire, which was seeking programmers for an upcoming project, but did not want to commute to the company's offices in Pleasant Grove. Instead, Saffire's owner convinced them to start their own company. Subsequently, Blackburn and his acquaintances established Avalanche in October 1995, with Blackburn becoming the company's president.

On April 19, 2005, Buena Vista Games (later renamed Disney Interactive Studios), the video game publishing arm of The Walt Disney Company, announced that it had acquired Avalanche for an undisclosed price. Buena Vista Games established a sister studio to Avalanche, Fall Line Studio, in November 2006. The studio was merged into Avalanche in January 2009. In January 2013, Avalanche unveiled the toys-to-life cross-platform game Disney Infinity. On May 10, 2016, due to a lack of growth in the toys-to-life market and increasing development costs, Disney discontinued Disney Infinity and closed down Disney Interactive Studios, including Avalanche. Many former Avalanche workers were hired by castAR to create a new studio in Salt Lake City. 

On January 24, 2017, Warner Bros. Interactive Entertainment (now Warner Bros. Games) announced that it had acquired and re-opened the studio, with Blackburn returning as its chief executive officer. The studio's first title under the new ownership was Cars 3: Driven to Win.

Hogwarts Legacy was released in 2023 as Avalanche's first independent game since it was acquired by Warner Bros. Games. The open-world action role-playing game was published by the publisher Portkey Games, which is also owned by Warner Bros. Games. The game was officially announced as part of the PlayStation 5 Showcase on September 16, 2020 and was subsequently named "Star of the Evening" by the daily newspaper Die Welt. It has been released for Windows, PlayStation 4, PlayStation 5, Xbox One, Xbox Series X/S and Nintendo Switch.

Games developed

References

External links 
 

1995 establishments in Utah
2005 mergers and acquisitions
2016 disestablishments in Utah
2017 establishments in Utah
2017 mergers and acquisitions
American companies established in 1995
American companies established in 2017
Companies based in Salt Lake City
Disney acquisitions
Former subsidiaries of The Walt Disney Company
Re-established companies
Video game companies based in Utah
Video game companies disestablished in 2016
Video game companies established in 1995
Video game companies established in 2017
Video game development companies
Warner Bros. Games